Streptomyces ipomoeae is a bacterium species from the genus of Streptomyces which has been isolated from rot from potatoes. Streptomyces ipomoeae produces thaxtomin C and ipomycin. Streptomyces ipomoeae can cause soft rot disease on sweet potatoes.

Further reading

See also 
 List of Streptomyces species

References

External links
Type strain of Streptomyces ipomoeae at BacDive -  the Bacterial Diversity Metadatabase	

ipomoeae
Bacteria described in 1948